Events from the year 1962 in Scotland.

Incumbents 

 Secretary of State for Scotland and Keeper of the Great Seal – John Maclay until 13 July; then Michael Noble

Law officers 
 Lord Advocate – William Grant; then Ian Shearer, Lord Avonside
 Solicitor General for Scotland – David Colville Anderson

Judiciary 
 Lord President of the Court of Session and Lord Justice General – Lord Clyde
 Lord Justice Clerk – Lord Thomson, then Lord Grant
 Chairman of the Scottish Land Court – Lord Gibson

Events 
 1 February – Loganair, the Scottish airline, is established.
 12 March – the Church of the Good Shepherd in Ayr (1957) is elevated to the Good Shepherd Cathedral for the Roman Catholic Diocese of Galloway.
 16 April – Livingston is officially designated as a New Town.
 19 April – the North British Locomotive Company of Springburn goes into liquidation.
 14 June – West Lothian by-election: Tam Dalyell retains the seat for Labour with the Scottish National Party coming second.
 16 August – the series Dr. Finlay's Casebook is first broadcast on BBC Television across the U.K.
 25 September – the last steam locomotive built in Scotland, by Andrew Barclay Sons & Co. of Kilmarnock, is despatched to its customer in Sumatra.
 22 November – Glasgow Woodside by-election: Labour gain the seat from the Conservatives.
 6 December – last permanent residents leave the Island of Stroma.
 Late – origins of Findhorn Foundation.
 The first nude mouse strain is discovered by N. R. Grist at Ruchill Hospital's Brownlee virology laboratory in Glasgow.

Births 
 January – William Duff, dentist, jailed for fraud and reckless endangerment
 3 January – Gavin Hastings, rugby union player
 4 January – Robin Guthrie, guitarist and producer (Cocteau Twins)
 5 January – Murray Pittock, cultural historian
 10 January – Ford Kiernan, actor and comedian
 11 January – Steve Hislop, motorcycle racer (killed in helicopter accident 2003)
 February – John Gordon Sinclair (born Gordon John Sinclair), actor
 26 February – Pen Hadow (born Rupert Nigel Pendrill Hadow), arctic explorer
 5 March – The Proclaimers (Charlie and Craig Reid), twin folk rock musicians
 9 March – Pete Wishart, SNP MP and member of Celtic rock group Runrig
 17 March
 Clare Grogan, singer and actress
 Andy Kerr, Labour MSP (1999–2011) and government minister
 10 April – Nicky Campbell, radio and television presenter and journalist
 22 April – Ann McKechin, Labour MP
 23 April – John Hannah, film and television actor
 13 May – Kathleen Jamie, poet
 17 May
Craig Ferguson, American television host, stand-up comedian, writer, actor, director, author, producer and voice artist
Alan Johnston, journalist
 19 May – Iain Harvie, guitarist
 24 May – Derek Browning, former Moderator of the General Assembly of the Church of Scotland
 27 May – David Mundell, Secretary of State for Scotland, Conservative MP and solicitor
 13 June – Paul Motwani, Grandmaster (chess)
 22 June – Bobby Gillespie, rock singer-songwriter (Primal Scream)
 30 June – Colin Campbell, 7th Earl Cawdor, peer and architect
 24 August – Ali Smith, novelist
 23 September – Deborah Orr, journalist (died 2019)
 24 September – Ally McCoist, international footballer, manager, television pundit and A Question of Sport team captain
 6 November – Stuart Dougal, football referee
 28 December – Kaye Adams, television presenter
 Jackie Bird, journalist and newsreader
 Jack Docherty, writer, actor, presenter and producer

Deaths 
 19 April – Sir Harold Yarrow, 2nd Baronet, industrialist (born 1884 in England)
 15 August – Bob McIntyre, motorcycle racer (born 1928)

The arts
 5 June – Scottish Opera, Scotland’s national opera company, is founded by Alexander Gibson.
 August–September – Dmitri Shostakovich and Benjamin Britten are present at the Edinburgh Festival for performances of their works.
 5 October – global release of the film Dr. No with Edinburgh-born Sean Connery originating the film character of James Bond.
 Folk group The Corries is formed in Edinburgh.

See also 

 1962 in Northern Ireland
 1962 in Wales

References 

 
Scotland
Years of the 20th century in Scotland
1960s in Scotland